The bluespot mullet (Crenimugil seheli) is a member of the ray-finned fish family Mugilidae found worldwide in coastal temperate and tropical waters, and in some species in fresh water. Crenimugil seheli have served as an important source of food in South East Asia.

References

bluespot mullet
bluespot mullet
Taxa named by Peter Forsskål